Grand Marais Airport  is a public use airport located three nautical miles (6 km) southeast of the central business district of Grand Marais, a community in Burt Township, Alger County, Michigan, United States. The airport is owned by Burt Township.

Facilities and aircraft 
It has two runways with turf surfaces: 5/23 is 2,600 by 150 feet (792 x 46 m) and 14/32 is 2,800 by 100 feet (853 x 30 m).

For the 12-month period ending December 31, 2017, the airport had 100 general aviation aircraft operations, an average of 9 per month. In July 2020, there was 1 aircraft based at this airport, a single-engine airplane.

The airport does not have a fixed-base operator, and there is no fuel available.

Events
In mid June, the neighboring harbor at Grand Marais is the site for an annual sea plane fly-in hosted by the Grand Marais Pilots Association on behalf of the National Seaplane Pilots Association.

References

External links 
 Aerial photo as of 6 May 1993 from USGS The National Map

Airports in Michigan
Buildings and structures in Alger County, Michigan
Transportation in Alger County, Michigan
Airports in the Upper Peninsula of Michigan
Aviation in Michigan